Puaikura F.C. (also known historically as Arorangi FC) is a Cook Islands football club located in Arorangi, Cook Islands. It currently plays in Cook Islands Round Cup the main football league competition. They have won two Cook Islands Round Cup championships in 1985 and 1987 and one Cook Islands Cup in 1985 as Arorangi FC. They competed in the 2004 Cook Islands Round Cup under the name Puaikura FC, where they finished sixth.

Current squad

Titles
Cook Islands Round Cup: 4
1985, 1987, 2013, 2016,
2017, 2018, 2019.

Cook Islands Cup: 3

1985, 2016, 2017, 2018

References

https://pt.wikipedia.org/wiki/Campeonato_Cookense_de_Futebol

Football clubs in the Cook Islands